Asamati may refer to:
Asamati, Resen, a village in the North Macedonia
A minor Hindu deity described in Mandala 10
The name of a king, with the patronymic Râthaprośṭha, according to the Anukramani